Benow or Bonu may refer to various places in Iran:

 Benow, Lamerd, Fars Province
 Benow, Larestan, Fars Province
 Banu, Khamir, Hormozgan Province
 Bonu, Sistan and Baluchestan

See also
 Banu (disambiguation)
 Benu (disambiguation)